The 2021–22 season is the 51st season in the existence of FC Groningen and the club's 24th consecutive season in the top flight of Dutch football. In addition to the domestic league, FC Groningen will participate in this season's editions of the KNVB Cup.

Players

First-team squad

Transfers

In

Out

Pre-season and friendlies

Competitions

Overall record

Eredivisie

League table

Results summary

Results by round

Matches
The league fixtures were announced on 11 June 2021.

KNVB Cup

First round

Second round

Round of 16

References

FC Groningen seasons
FC Groningen